Jameh Shuran-e Olya (also Romanized as Jāmeh Shūrān-e ‘Olyā) is a village in Mahidasht Rural District, Mahidasht District, Kermanshah County, Kermanshah Province, Iran. At the 2006 census, its population was 321, in 91 families.

References 

Populated places in Kermanshah County